"Siis, kui maailm magab veel" (When the world is still sleeping) is a song from Terminaator's musical "Romeo & Julia". It's the most famous song from the musical, and has been played extensively in the radio.

The video
Hele and Kristjan are singing the song in a room filled with candles, Terminaator is playing musical instruments in the background, with the exception of Jaagup, who is lying on a couch, writing the lyrics of the song.

Track listing
 Siis, kui maailm magab veel
 Siis, kui maailm magab veel (karaoke)
 Siis, kui maailm magab veel (video)

2006 singles
Estonian songs